Nuobi (autonym: Lolbiq;  or  in Jinping County meaning 'downriver'; Chinese: 糯比 Luobi (Lobi)) is a Loloish language of south-central Yunnan, China.

Distribution
Nuobi is spoken in:
Xinping Yi and Dai Autonomous County
Yuanjiang Hani, Yi and Dai Autonomous County
Jinping Miao, Yao, and Dai Autonomous County

Dai (2009) reports that ethnic Hani in Yangjie Township (羊街乡), Yuanjiang County belong to the Nuomei (糯美) and Nuobi (糯比) subgroups, who number 9,000 people and 6,000 people respectively in the township. The Nuomei live mostly in Gedie (戈垤), Dangduo (党舵) (which also has Kucong speakers), and Bamu (坝木) administrative villages, while the Nuobi reside mostly in Langzhi (朗支) (which also has Yi speakers in Zhongliangzi 中梁子 ), Yangjie (羊街), and Diexia (垤霞) (including Yidie, 依垤) villages.

Vocabulary
The following basic vocabulary word list of Nuobi is from the Xinping County Ethnic Gazetteer  (1992:209–210).

Notes

References

 Xinping County Ethnic Gazetteer [新平彝族傣族自治县民族志] (1992). Kunming: Yunnan People's Press [云南民族出版社].
 Wang Liujin 王六金; Li Zhengyou 李正有. 2011. 国际哈尼/阿卡区域文化调查: 中国金平县哈尼田哈尼族罗比·罗们人文化实录. Kunming: Yunnan People's Press 云南人民出版社.  (Luobi 罗比 and Luomei 罗们 people of Hanitian 哈尼田, Jinhe Town 金河镇, Jinping County)

Southern Loloish languages
Languages of Yunnan